In the 2019–20 season, Partizan NIS Belgrade will compete in the Serbian League, Radivoj Korać Cup, Adriatic League and EuroCup.

Players

Current roster

Players with multiple nationalities
   Marcus Paige
   Nemanja Gordić

Depth chart

On loan

Roster changes

In

|}

Out

|}

Pre-season and friendlies

Adriatic League

Regular season

Matches

On 12 March 2020, ABA League announced it was suspending the season due to the coronavirus pandemic. On 27 May, the season was voided.

EuroCup

Regular season

Group B

Matches

Top 16: Group E

Matches

Quarterfinals
On 12 March 2020, Euroleague Basketball announced it was suspending the season due to the coronavirus pandemic. On 25 May, the season was voided.

Adriatic Supercup

Radivoj Korać Cup

Individual awards

Adriatic League

MVP of the Round

 Rashawn Thomas – Round 5

MVP of the Month

 Rashawn Thomas – December

Eurocup

MVP of the Round - Regular season
 Rade Zagorac – Round 2

MVP of the Round - Top 16
 Corey Walden – Round 5

Adriatic Supercup

MVP

 Rashawn Thomas

Radivoj Korać Cup

MVP

   Ognjen Jaramaz

Top Scorer

  Marcus Paige

Statistics

ABA League

Eurocup

ABA Supercup

Radivoj Korać Cup

References

External links
 Official website
 Partizan at ABA League.com

KK Partizan seasons
Partizan
Partizan
Partizan